Italy had 11 banking group (excluding banking group that owned by foreign banks) that were supervised by the European Central Bank directly. According Mediobanca, there are more than 350 banking groups or independent banks as of 2017. However, ECB considered ICCREA Banca, the clearing house of Italian cooperative banks federation as one banking group, which the publication of Mediobanca considered the cooperative banks are individual entities, such as Banca di Credito Cooperativo di Roma was ranked 22nd in the publication, while ICCREA Banca and Bank of Italy were excluded from the publication.

List of banks by total assets
 

Note: Banks with assets less than €10 billion were omitted from this wiki list. Barclays Bank, Italian branch was also excluded

See also

Banking in Italy

References

Banking in Italy
Italy
Banks

Italy